is a 2015 Japanese drama film directed by Naomi Kawase. It is the second film, after I Wish, to star real-life grandmother and granddaughter Kirin Kiki and Kyara Uchida. The film was selected to open the Un Certain Regard section at the 2015 Cannes Film Festival. It was also selected to be screened in the Contemporary World Cinema section of the 2015 Toronto International Film Festival.

Plot
Sentaro is a middle-aged man who runs a small dorayaki shop in the outskirts of Tokyo. The shop is frequented by locals and secondary-school pupils alike. When he puts up a notice saying that he is looking for a co-worker, he is approached by Tokue, a lady in her mid-seventies, who states that she has always wanted to work in a dorayaki shop. Sentaro initially rejects her application, afraid that the work would prove too much for the old lady who, moreover, has somewhat deformed hands. However, he is swayed when he tries Tokue's bean paste; its taste and texture are far superior to that of the factory-made bean paste Sentaro has been using. Sentaro asks Tokue to start making bean paste with him, revealing that up until now, he did not actually like his own product.

Business begins to thrive, and very soon Tokue also starts serving customers and packaging dorayaki. However, when customers realize that the deformities to Tokue's hand were caused by leprosy, they stop coming, and Sentaro is forced to let her go. Wakana, a school girl whom Sentaro has befriended, eventually suggests that they go and visit Tokue at the sanatorium where she and other patients were forced to stay until the 1996 repeal of the 1953 Leprosy Prevention Law. Sentaro feels guilty that he was not able to protect Tokue against the prejudice of their customers, but she assures him that she is grateful for the time she was allowed to spend at the shop.

When Tokue dies of pneumonia a few months later, she leaves Sentaro her own bean paste making equipment, as well as a cassette recording intended for him and Wakana. In it, Tokue stresses that a person's worth lies not in their career, but simply in their being, and also that joy comes from taking in the sensory experiences of the world that surrounds us.

Through most of the film, Sentaro had been a man weighed down by his past. When Tokue no longer works for the shop, he sends her a letter, in which he reveals that he once seriously injured a man in a pub brawl, something he is still ashamed of. He was subsequently imprisoned and was ordered to pay a large reparation to the victim. Physically, Sentaro is tied to the dorayaki shop, which is owned by the loan shark that furnished the money for the reparation—money which Sentaro has not yet been able to pay back. Yet at the end of the film, Sentaro is seen selling dorayaki from his own stall in the local park, and it is clear he has learned to live with his circumstances.

Cast
 Kirin Kiki as Tokue
 Masatoshi Nagase as Sentaro
 Kyara Uchida as Wakana
 Etsuko Ichihara
 Miyoko Asada as the shop owner's wife
 Miki Mizuno

Title
For its debut at the Cannes Film Festival, the film was promoted under the title Sweet Red Bean Paste. At other festivals — and for the Australian release — the original Japanese title An was used. The subsequent international theatrical release title for the film became Sweet Bean. The English translation of the novel on which the film is based is titled Sweet Bean Paste (Oneworld Publications 2017, written by Durian Sukegawa, translated by Alison Watts).

Themes
The film centres primarily around the themes of freedom and joy, suggesting that by embracing our sensory experiences we may attain richer, more rewarding lives. As Deborah Young writes, "The undercurrent that runs through the film is a message to learn from nature and enjoy the wonder of life moment by moment, no matter what hard knocks you're dealt". This aspect of the film ties in with the director's earlier work, "A consistent underlying concern of [which] has been the unspoken bond between man and his environment". The film's plot contain echoes to such films as The House Is Black and Yomeddine.

Reception
The film has grossed  in Japan. The film received generally positive notices, with a 60 out of 100 rating from Metacritic across 16 reviews and a score of 88% "Fresh" rating at Rotten Tomatoes across 41 reviews. The film was a "Critic's Pick" by The New York Times, with the Times''' Glenn Kenny scoring it at 90 out of 100, writing that "The movie, beautifully shot and acted, earns its ultimate sense of hope by confronting real heartbreak head-on, and with compassion". The Guardian''‘s film critic Peter Bradshaw scored the film at 2 out of 5 stars, writing that "Despite some touching moments, and earnest performances, I must confess to feeling exasperated by the sentimentality and stereotype being served up". The film earned actress Kirin Kiki the Best Performance by an Actress award at the 2015 Asia Pacific Screen Awards.

References

External links
 
  
 Synopsis, statement, interview with Kawase and video clips in: Festival de Cannes, 2015 

2015 films
2015 drama films
Japanese drama films
2010s Japanese-language films
Films directed by Naomi Kawase
2010s Japanese films